The 2011 Karshi Challenger was a professional tennis tournament played on hard courts. It was the fifth edition of the tournament which was part of the 2011 ATP Challenger Tour. It took place in Qarshi, Uzbekistan between 15 and 21 August 2011.

ATP entrants

Seeds

 1 Rankings are as of August 8, 2011.

Other entrants
The following players received wildcards into the singles main draw:
  Farrukh Dustov
  Murad Inoyatov
  Christopher Rungkat
  Nigmat Shofayziev

The following players received entry as a special exemption into the singles main draw:
  Denis Istomin

The following players received entry from the qualifying draw:
  Mikhail Elgin
  Sarvar Ikramov
  Mikhail Ledovskikh
  Gerald Melzer

The following players received entry from the qualifying draw as a lucky loser:
  Junn Mitsuhashi

Champions

Singles

 Denis Istomin def.  Blaž Kavčič, 6–3, 1–6, 6–1

Doubles

 Mikhail Elgin /  Alexander Kudryavtsev def.  Konstantin Kravchuk /  Denys Molchanov, 3–6, 6–3, [11–9]

External links
Official Website
ITF Search 
ATP official site

Karshi Challenger
Karshi Challenger